Stephen Bourne may refer to:

 Stephen Bourne (writer) (born 1957), British writer, film and social historian
 Stephen R. Bourne (born 1944), British-born computer scientist